Andrew George Rankin (born 11 May 1944 in Bootle) is an English former professional footballer who played in the Football League as a goalkeeper for Everton, Watford and Huddersfield Town. He also made an international appearance for the England under-23 team. In 1973 Rankin became the inaugural Watford Player of the Season, an accolade he would reclaim in the 1974–75 season.<ref

References

1944 births
Living people
Sportspeople from Bootle
English footballers
Association football goalkeepers
Everton F.C. players
Watford F.C. players
Huddersfield Town A.F.C. players
English Football League players
Footballers from Liverpool
England under-23 international footballers